Tambacara is a small town and principal settlement of the Diafounou Tambacara commune of Diafounou Tambacara, in the Cercle of Yélimané in the Kayes Region of south-western Mali, near the border of Mauritania.

References

Populated places in Kayes Region